Edward John Warren is a former Australian politician. He was the Labor member for Goyder in the Northern Territory Legislative Assembly from 2005 to 2008.

|}

Warren was a geotechnical and geological engineering consultant before his entry into politics, working in both the Northern Territory and Papua New Guinea. His first foray into politics was an unsuccessful run for the seat of Jingili in 1984. Warren was elected as part of Labor's 2005 landslide win after Country Liberal incumbent Peter Maley was disendorsed just a month before the election.  However, a redistribution ahead of the 2008 election erased Warren's majority and made Goyder a notional CLP seat.  He was easily defeated in 2008 by the CLP's Kezia Purick.

References

Year of birth missing (living people)
Living people
Members of the Northern Territory Legislative Assembly
Australian Labor Party members of the Northern Territory Legislative Assembly
21st-century Australian politicians